The Battle of Rafah refers to any of the military engagements fought in and around Rafah, today in the Gaza Strip:
 Battle of Rafa in World War I
 Battle of Rafah (1948) in the 1948 Arab–Israeli War
 Battle of Rafah (2009), part of the Palestinian political violence